The Tele-Fever (stylized as tele-fever) is a second-generation home video game console which was released and marketed by German coffee roaster chain Tchibo in 1986 only in Germany for a list price of 99 Deutsche Mark (DM). It is one of the last variants of the Arcadia 2001 home video game console by Emerson Radio and therefore compatible with all software from it.

The Tele-Fever was only manufactured in very small quantities and is rarely offered today. Only a few games were released for the system. After a short time, the production was discontinued.

Technical specifications 

 Platform family: 8 bit
 CPU: Signetics 2650 clocked at 3,58 Mhz
 RAM: 1 kB
 ROM: None
 Colors: 9 different colors; 4 for characters, 4 for sprites, and 1 for the background
 Sound: 1 channel
 Input devices: 1 hardwired joystick-based game controller, one is built in the console/12 buttons each
 Power: 15 V DC, 600 mA

Reception 

The Tele-Fever was a weak console compared to other available consoles around its release time, but very cheap which made it attractive. The console was mostly sold as a budget item in Tchibo sections of discounters.

Some people think the design of the Tele-Fever is quite appealing.

The Tele-Fever is seen as an example for a console that contributed to the 1983 video game crash.

Legacy 
In 2019, Tchibo released another console, the Retro-Mini-Spielekonsole, which is a 8-bit dedicated handheld game console that contains 153 pre-installed retro games and costs €14.99. It is basically a clone of Thumbs Up's Retro Arcade Games, Monsterzeug's Retro Arcade, Radbag's Retro Mini-Spielekonsole, ORB's spielesammlung Retro Pocket junior, and Karsten International's Arcade Game Portable Console, which was also released under the name Retro Pocket Spiele/Retro Pocket Games in Germany in a cooperation with Woolworth, promobo Retro Spielekonsole Tshirt.

Literature 
Spielkonsolen und Heimcomputer, Forster, Winnie, 2015

External links 
Official website of the Retro-Mini-Spielekonsole

References 

 Radbag's Retro Mini-Spielekonsole, 
Computer-related introductions in 1986
Home video game consoles
Second-generation video game consoles
Products introduced in 1986
1986 in video gaming
Europe-exclusive video games
Video games developed in Germany